T-stages, sometimes called booster stages, are mounted on the low pressure (LP) shaft of some turbofan engines directly behind the fan.

T-stages are used to increase overall pressure ratio and, for a given  core size, the core mass flow. This is demonstrated by the following relationship:

where:

hp compressor entry mass flow = 

core size = 

hp compressor total head pressure ratio =  
  
lp compressor total head pressure ratio =  
 
lp compressor entry total pressure = 

lp compressor entry total temperature = 

hp compressor total head temperature ratio =  
                      
lp compressor total head temperature ratio =  which varies more slowly than 

So as  increases with the addition of T-stages,   also increases.

T-stages are a popular method for uprating the thrust of an engine (see, for example the Pratt & Whitney Canada PW500).

The alternative is to place a zero-stage, mounted on the HP shaft, at the front of the HP compressor. This approach requires a significant change in the HP turbine, whereas a T-stage can, if necessary, be accommodated by simply adding another stage to the rear of the LP turbine.

Although T-stages usually only supercharge the core stream, some engines do feature a deliberately oversized intermediate pressure (IP) compressor, which compresses both the core flow and a proportion of the bypass flow. This enhances the stability of the T-stages during throttling. Where necessary, the alternative is to employ blow-off valves.

References

Jet engines